Stand and Deliver is a 1928 silent film starring Rod La Rocque and Lupe Vélez and directed by Donald Crisp. Cecil B. DeMille produced the picture with release through Pathé Exchange.

Cast
Rod La Rocque - Roger Norman
Lupe Vélez - Jania, a Peasant Girl
Warner Oland - Ghika, Bandit Leader
Louis Natheaux - Captain Dargia
Clarence Burton - Captain Melok
Charles Stevens - Pietro
James Dime - Patch Eye
Frank Lanning -
Alexander Palasthy - Juja
Bernard Siegel - Blind Operator
Donald Crisp - London Club Member

Preservation status
Prints of the film are preserved at George Eastman House and the UCLA Film and Television Archive.

References

External links

1928 films
American silent feature films
Films directed by Donald Crisp
American romantic drama films
American black-and-white films
Pathé Exchange films
1928 romantic drama films
1920s American films
Silent romantic drama films
Silent American drama films